Florinda da Rosa Silva Chan (陳麗敏) (1954–) the first Secretary for Administration and Justice in Macau.

Chan was born in Macau in June 1954. She was educated in Macau holding a master's degree in Business Administration. In July 1993, she attended a one-year programme in Chinese Language and Public Administration in Beijing. She is fluent in various languages including Chinese, Portuguese, English and Italian.

She has been with the Macau civil service since 1983 having served in various positions:

 Division Chief, Division of Textile Negotiations 1983–1985
 Macau Liaison Office in Brussels
 Division Chief, Division of Quotas Control 1987–1995
 Deputy Director of Economic Services Department 1995–1998
 Director of Economic Services Department 1998–1999
 Secretary-general of the Economic Committee 1993
 Secretary to the Presidium of the Center for the Transfer of Productivity and Science and Technology 1998–1999
 member of the Standing Committee of the Consultative Committee for the Basic Law of MSAR
 Vice-chairman of the Economic Committee of the Macau Government
 Chairman of the General Committee of the Center for the Transfer of Productivity and Science and Technology
 Council member of the Association of the Basic Law of MSAR

References
 Information on the major officials and the Procurator-General of the MSAR

1954 births
Living people
Macanese people
Government ministers of Macau
Macau women in politics
Female justice ministers